is a railway station in the city of Seto, Aichi Prefecture,  Japan, operated by Meitetsu.

Lines

Station layout
The station has two opposed side platforms connected by a level crossing. The station has automated ticket machines, Manaca automated turnstiles and is unattended.

Platforms

Adjacent stations

|-
!colspan=5|Nagoya Railroad

Station history
The Seto Electric Railway was absorbed into the Meitetsu group on September 1, 1939. It was renamed to its present name on January 20, 1958.

Passenger statistics
In fiscal 2017, the station was used by an average of 1353 passengers daily.

Surrounding area
 Seto City Hall

See also
 List of Railway Stations in Japan

References

External links

 Official web page 

Railway stations in Japan opened in 1905
Railway stations in Aichi Prefecture
Stations of Nagoya Railroad
Seto, Aichi